Christian Harold Richard Duval (born in 1968) is a politician and former Private Parliamentary Secretary (PPS) of Mauritius. He is more commonly known as Richard Duval.

Early life, education & career
Richard Duval grew up with his mother Jacqueline Dalais in the southern part of Mauritius. He was later adopted by politician Sir Gaëtan Duval. 

Following his secondary education at St. Joseph's College in Curepipe he travelled to France where he learned how to train horses under Robert Collet's guidance. Given his familiarity with the Mauritius Turf Club he opened a new stable called Écurie Richard Duval in July 1994 soon after his return to Mauritius. However the stable closed down within a few years.

Political career
Following his resignation as a member of the ailing PMSD to join his step-brother's new party PMXD, Richard Duval's political career started in July 2005 when he was elected to the National Assembly in Constituency No. 12 (Mahébourg-Plaine-Magnien) as a candidate of Alliance Sociale (coalition of Labour PTr–PMXD–VF–MR–MMSM). His running mates Yatin Varma and Vasant Bunwaree were also elected in the same constituency during these elections. Richard Duval served as Private Parliamentary Secretary (PPS) until 2010.

At the November 2019 elections Richard Duval was a candidate of L'Alliance Nationale, a coalition of PMSD and Labour Party (PTr) in Constituency No. 12 where he was not elected. However he secured a seat as "Best Loser" in the National Assembly.

References

Profile

1968 births
Living people
Mauritian Creoles
Members of the National Assembly (Mauritius)
Parti Mauricien Social Démocrate politicians
Mauritian politicians of Indian descent